Wachusett Potato Chip Company in Fitchburg, Massachusetts was founded in 1937, by Polish-American brothers Theofil and Steven Krysiak. The company takes its name from nearby Mount Wachusett. The company was originally founded in Clinton, Massachusetts and moved to Fitchburg in 1947 when it purchased a decommissioned Fitchburg County jail building and grounds. The company converted the property and it has served as a manufacturing and distribution facility for snack products since that time. The company made several additions and renovations over time to accommodate manufacturing and storage needs. It completed its last large scale renovation in the 1980s which included the addition of air conditioning to the manufacturing facility.

Wachusett Potato Chip Company produces a variety of potato chips flavors including sour cream and onion, ketchup, salt and vinegar, no salt-added, barbecue and ripple chips. It is also distributes under its own label cheese curls and pop corn.

The chips are sold at stores including Wal-Mart, Hannaford, Stop and Shop, Price Chopper, and local restaurants and delis. 

Another large portion of Wachusett's production is dedicated to private label potato chips for supermarkets such as Price Chopper Supermarkets and as well for food service providers such as Sysco.

On October 19, 2011, Wachusett was sold to Hanover, PA-based Utz Quality Foods, Inc.  Utz paid $1.7 million for Wachusett's 56,000 square-foot facility. Utz announced that Wachusett's 50 employees would be kept on, including members of the Krysiak family. The company now operates as a subsidiary of Utz and still makes Wachusett products.

References

Massachusetts cuisine
Snack food manufacturers of the United States
Companies based in Worcester County, Massachusetts
1939 establishments in Massachusetts
American companies established in 1939
Food and drink companies established in 1939